Verotik is an American comic book company founded by heavy metal/horror punk musician Glenn Danzig. The comics are aimed toward adult readers as they often contain imagery of a sexual and/or violent nature.

The company's two longest-running titles were Verotika (15 issues) and  Satanika vols. 1 & 2 (total of 13 issues). Verotik was known for producing variant "chase covers" for some of its titles: expensive adult-only variants depicting nudity. The company was most active in the period 1994–2001, and has not released many new comics since 2009.

Notable creators associated with Verotik include Simon Bisley, Jae Lee, Tim Vigil, Liam Sharp, Martin Emond, Drew Posada, Jason Pearson, Shelby Robertson, Hart D. Fisher, Joe Chiodo, and Duke Mighten.

History 
Since childhood, Glenn Danzig had been an avid comic book collector with frustrated aspirations of being a comic book writer and artist. His fascination with horror was expressed through his music and comic books, and in August 1994 he founded Verotik (the name Verotik is a portmanteau created by Danzig from the words "violent" and "erotic").

The company was originally led by editor-in-chief Valarie Jones of the New Comics Group. Jones left at the end of 1995, succeeded by Steven Wardlaw. Writer/self-publisher Hart D. Fisher worked as an editor at Verotik in 1994–1995.

In addition to its line of original erotic horror titles, Verotik also reprinted some Golden Age comics in the period 1994–1998. They also were the first U.S. publisher to translate and publish Go Nagai's Devilman.

Verotik published Edward Lee's novel Header in 1995; the book was later adapted into a feature film.

The Verotik title Grub Girl, also by Edward Lee, was developed into a pornographic film of the same name in 2006, starring Brittney Skye and Eva Angelina. The movie was directed by Craven Moorehead, who would later go on to direct Danzig's music video for "Crawl Across Your Killing Floor". The soundtrack features a remix of the Danzig song "Unspeakable". Glenn Danzig is working on a movie adaptation of the Verotik title Ge Rouge, which he will also direct.

In 2019, Cleopatra Entertainment released Verotika, an anthology horror film written, directed, and scored by Danzig which was based on the company's Verotkia anthology.

Controversy 
In 1994, when Verotik published a title with Phantom Lady reprints, AC Comics (which had earlier published Phantom Lady reprints) sued the company for trademark infringement.

In 1996, Oklahoma City-based retailer Planet Comics was accused of "trafficking in obscene materials" because of selling copies of the publisher's Verotika anthology issue #4:

List of titles 
 Alphabet of Murder (1994), #1
 Albino Spider of Dajette (1997–1998), #0.5 & 1–2
 Bizo: The Intense Art of Simon Bisley (1997)
 Chiodo: Darkworks (2004); a collection of art by Joe Chiodo
 Dalkiel: The Prophecy #1
 Dark Horror of Morella (2000) (featuring art by Tim Vigil)
 Darker Horror of Morella (2001)
 Darkest Horror of Morella (2006)
 Death Dealer (1995–1997), #1–4 (art by Liam Sharp, based on the Frank Frazetta painting of the same name.)
 Drukija: Contessa of Blood (2007); prose with illustrations by Simon Bisley.
 Ge Rouge (1997–1998), 0.5 & #1–3
 G.O.T.H. (1995–1996), #1–3 (art by Liam Sharp)
 Grub Girl (1997), #1
 Igrat (1995), #1–2
 The Infernals (2017)
 Inquisitor (2002)
 Jaguar God 
Jaguar God v1 (1996–1997), #1–7
Jaguar God: Illustrations (2001)
Jaguar God: Return to Xibalba (2003)
 Jaguar God: Snake Brothers Revenge (2013)
 Joe Chiodo: How to Draw and Paint Pin-Ups (2006)
 Joe Chiodo: Works of Art (2003)
 Satanika vol. 1 (1995), #1–3 (art by Shelby Robertson)
 Satanika vol. 2 (1995–1999), #1–10
 Shin Devilman (1995–1996), #1–3
 Sunglasses After Dark (1995–1996), #0.5 & 1–6
 Venus Domina (1996–1997), #1–3
 Verotika (1994–1997), #1–15
 Verotik Illustrated (1997–1998), #1–3
 Verotik World (2002–2004), #1–3; (2014), #4
 WingBird
WingBird Special (1996), #1
WingBird Venus Domina San Diego Special (1996), #1
WingBird Returns (1997)
WingBird Igrat X (1997), #1
WinBird Akuma-She (1998)
WingBird Black and White Bondage Special (1998), #1
WingBird Girls of Verotik Sexy Pin-Ups (1999)

Golden Age reprints 
 Black Angel #1 (1996) — reprints eight Black Angel stories from Hillman Periodicals' 1941 series, Air Fighters Comics
 Blue Bolt (1998) — trade paperback collection of stories from Novelty Press' Blue Bolt comics
 Phantom Lady: Crime Never Pays (1994) — reprints stories from the Phantom Lady#Fox Feature Syndicate & Star Publications series

References

External links 
 
 

American companies established in 1994
Comic book publishing companies of the United States
Erotic comics
Horror comics
Horror punk
Lists of comics by publisher
Publishing companies established in 1994